The Gotha LD.1 (for Land Doppeldecker - "Land Biplane") and its derivatives were a family of military aircraft produced in Germany just before and during the early part of World War I. Used for training and reconnaissance, they were conventional designs with two-bay unstaggered wings, tailskid landing gear, and two open cockpits in tandem. Made quickly obsolete by the rapid advances in aviation technology, several were supplied as military aid to the Ottoman Empire when withdrawn from German service.

Variants
LD.1
Basic open-cockpit biplane
LD.1a
1915 variant with a  Oberursel U.I rotary engine.
LD.2
Similar to the LD 1a but fitted with a  Mercedes D.I inline piston engine.
LD.6a
Minor changes and engine variations.
LD.7 (B.I)
Minor changes and fitted with a  Mercedes D.II inline piston engine.

Operators

Luftstreitkrafte

Ottoman Air Force

Specifications (LD.1)

See also

References

Further reading

External links
 Das Virtuelle Luftfahrtmuseum

LD.1
1910s German military utility aircraft
Single-engined tractor aircraft
Aircraft first flown in 1914